Alexander Kotov (born 11 July 1994) is a Russian handball player for Chekhovskiye Medvedi and the Russian national team.

He represented Russia at the 2020 European Men's Handball Championship.

References

External links

1994 births
Living people
Russian male handball players
Sportspeople from Volgograd